The Aérospatiale/BAC Concorde is a retired Franco-British supersonic airliner jointly developed and manufactured by Sud Aviation (later Aérospatiale) and the British Aircraft Corporation (BAC).

Studies started in 1954, and France and the UK signed a treaty establishing the development project on 29 November 1962, as the programme cost was estimated at £70 million (£ in ).
Construction of the six prototypes began in February 1965, and the first flight took off from Toulouse on 2 March 1969.

The market was predicted for 350 aircraft, and the manufacturers received up to 100 option orders from many major airlines.
On 9 October 1975, it received its French Certificate of Airworthiness, and from the UK CAA on 5 December.

Concorde is a tailless aircraft design with a narrow fuselage permitting a 4-abreast seating for 92 to 128 passengers, an ogival delta wing and a droop nose for landing visibility.
It is powered by four Rolls-Royce/Snecma Olympus 593 turbojets with variable engine intake ramps, and reheat for take-off and acceleration to supersonic speed.
Constructed out of aluminium, it was the first airliner to have analogue fly-by-wire flight controls. 

Delays and cost overruns increased the programme cost to £1.5–2.1 billion in 1976, (£– in ).
Concorde entered service on 21 January of that year with Air France from Paris-Roissy and British Airways from London Heathrow.
Transatlantic flights was the main market, to Washington Dulles from 24 May, and to New York JFK from 17 October 1977.
Air France and British Airways remained the sole customers with seven airframes each, for a total production of twenty.
Supersonic flight more than halved travel times, but sonic booms over the ground limited it to transoceanic flights only.

Its only competitor was the Tupolev Tu-144, carrying passengers from November 1977 until a May 1978 crash, while the larger and faster Boeing 2707 was cancelled in 1971.

On 25 July 2000, Air France Flight 4590 crashed shortly after take-off with all 109 occupants and four on ground killed, the only fatal incident involving Concorde.

Commercial service was suspended until November 2001, and Concorde aircraft were retired in 2003 after 27 years of commercial operations.
Most aircraft are on display in Europe and America.

Development

Early studies
The origins of the Concorde project date to the early 1950s, when Arnold Hall, director of the Royal Aircraft Establishment (RAE), asked Morien Morgan to form a committee to study the supersonic transport (SST) concept. The group met for the first time in February 1954 and delivered their first report in April 1955. At the time it was known that the drag at supersonic speeds was strongly related to the span of the wing. This led to the use of short-span, thin trapezoidal wings such as those seen on the control surfaces of many missiles, or in aircraft such as the Lockheed F-104 Starfighter or the Avro 730 that the team studied. The team outlined a baseline configuration that resembled an enlarged Avro 730.

This same short span produced very little lift at low speed, which resulted in extremely long take-off runs and high landing speeds. In an SST design, this would have required enormous engine power to lift off from existing runways, and to provide the fuel needed, "some horribly large aeroplanes" resulted. Based on this, the group considered the concept of an SST infeasible, and instead suggested continued low-level studies into supersonic aerodynamics.

Slender deltas
Soon after, Johanna Weber and Dietrich Küchemann at the RAE published a series of reports on a new wing planform, known in the UK as the "slender delta" concept. The team, including Eric Maskell whose report "Flow Separation in Three Dimensions" contributed to an understanding of the physical nature of separated flow, worked with the fact that delta wings can produce strong vortices on their upper surfaces at high angles of attack. The vortex will lower the air pressure and cause lift to be greatly increased. This effect had been noticed earlier, notably by Chuck Yeager in the Convair XF-92, but its qualities had not been fully appreciated. Weber suggested that this was no mere curiosity, and the effect could be used deliberately to improve low speed performance.

Küchemann's and Weber's papers changed the entire nature of supersonic design almost overnight. Although the delta had already been used on aircraft prior to this point, these designs used planforms that were not much different from a swept wing of the same span. Weber noted that the lift from the vortex was increased by the length of the wing it had to operate over, which suggested that the effect would be maximised by extending the wing along the fuselage as far as possible. Such a layout would still have good supersonic performance inherent to the short span, while also offering reasonable take-off and landing speeds using vortex generation. The only downside to such a design is that the aircraft would have to take off and land very "nose high" to generate the required vortex lift, which led to questions about the low speed handling qualities of such a design. It would also need to have long landing gear to produce the required angle of attack while still on the runway.

Küchemann presented the idea at a meeting where Morgan was also present. Test pilot Eric Brown recalls Morgan's reaction to the presentation, saying that he immediately seized on it as the solution to the SST problem. Brown considers this moment as being the true birth of the Concorde project.

Supersonic Transport Aircraft Committee

On 1 October 1956 the Ministry of Supply asked Morgan to form a new study group, the Supersonic Transport Aircraft Committee (STAC) (sometimes referred to as the Supersonic Transport Advisory Committee), with the explicit goal of developing a practical SST design and finding industry partners to build it. At the first meeting, on 5 November 1956, the decision was made to fund the development of a test bed aircraft to examine the low-speed performance of the slender delta, a contract that eventually produced the Handley Page HP.115.

STAC stated that an SST would have economic performance similar to existing subsonic types. A significant problem is that lift is not generated the same way at supersonic and subsonic speeds, with the lift-to-drag ratio for supersonic designs being about half that of subsonic designs. This means the aircraft would have to use more power than a subsonic design of the same size. But although they would burn more fuel in cruise, they would be able to fly more sorties in a given period of time, so fewer aircraft would be needed to service a particular route. This would remain economically advantageous as long as fuel represented a small percentage of operational costs, as it did at the time.

STAC suggested that two designs naturally fell out of their work, a transatlantic model flying at about Mach 2, and a shorter-range version flying at Mach 1.2 perhaps. Morgan suggested that a 150-passenger transatlantic SST would cost about £75 to £90 million to develop, and be in service in 1970. The smaller 100 passenger short-range version would cost perhaps £50 to £80 million, and be ready for service in 1968. To meet this schedule, development would need to begin in 1960, with production contracts let in 1962. Morgan strongly suggested that the US was already involved in a similar project, and that if the UK failed to respond it would be locked out of an airliner market that he believed would be dominated by SST aircraft.

In 1959, a study contract was awarded to Hawker Siddeley and Bristol for preliminary designs based on the slender delta concept, which developed as the HSA.1000 and Bristol 198. Armstrong Whitworth also responded with an internal design, the M-Wing, for the lower-speed shorter-range category. Even at this early time, both the STAC group and the government were looking for partners to develop the designs. In September 1959, Hawker approached Lockheed, and after the creation of British Aircraft Corporation in 1960, the former Bristol team immediately started talks with Boeing, General Dynamics, Douglas Aircraft, and Sud Aviation.

Ogee planform selected
Küchemann and others at the RAE continued their work on the slender delta throughout this period, considering three basic shapes; the classic straight-edge delta, the "gothic delta" that was rounded outward to appear like a gothic arch, and the "ogival wing" that was compound-rounded into the shape of an ogee. Each of these planforms had its own advantages and disadvantages in terms of aerodynamics. As they worked with these shapes, a practical concern grew to become so important that it forced selection of one of these designs.

Generally one wants to have the wing's centre of pressure (CP, or "lift point") close to the aircraft's centre of gravity (CG, or "balance point") to reduce the amount of control force required to pitch the aircraft. As the aircraft layout changes during the design phase, it is common for the CG to move fore or aft. With a normal wing design this can be addressed by moving the wing slightly fore or aft to account for this. With a delta wing running most of the length of the fuselage, this was no longer easy; moving the wing would leave it in front of the nose or behind the tail. Studying the various layouts in terms of CG changes, both during design and changes due to fuel use during flight, the ogee planform immediately came to the fore.

While the wing planform was evolving, so was the basic SST concept. Bristol's original Type 198 was a small design with an almost pure slender delta wing, but evolved into the larger Type 223.

To test the new wing, NASA privately assisted the team by modifying a Douglas F5D Skylancer with temporary wing modifications to mimic the wing selection. In 1965 the NASA test aircraft successfully tested the wing, and found that it reduced landing speeds noticeably over the standard delta wing. NASA Ames test center also ran simulations that showed the aircraft would suffer a sudden change in pitch when entering ground effect. Ames test pilots later participated in a joint cooperative test with the French and British test pilots and found that the simulations had been correct, and this information was added to pilot training.

Partnership with Sud Aviation
By this time similar political and economic concerns in France had led to their own SST plans. In the late 1950s the government requested designs from both the government-owned Sud Aviation and Nord Aviation, as well as Dassault. All three returned designs based on Küchemann and Weber's slender delta; Nord suggested a ramjet powered design flying at Mach 3, the other two were jet powered Mach 2 designs that were similar to each other. Of the three, the Sud Aviation Super-Caravelle won the design contest with a medium-range design deliberately sized to avoid competition with transatlantic US designs they assumed were already on the drawing board.

As soon as the design was complete, in April 1960, Pierre Satre, the company's technical director, was sent to Bristol to discuss a partnership. Bristol was surprised to find that the Sud team had designed a similar aircraft after considering the SST problem and coming to the very same conclusions as the Bristol and STAC teams in terms of economics. It was later revealed that the original STAC report, marked "For UK Eyes Only", had secretly been passed to France to win political favour. Sud made minor changes to the paper, and presented it as their own work.

Unsurprisingly, the two teams found much to agree on. France had no modern large jet engines, and had already concluded they would buy a British design anyway (as they had on the earlier subsonic Caravelle). As neither company had experience in the use of high-heat metals for airframes, a maximum speed of around Mach 2 was selected so aluminium could be used – above this speed the friction with the air warms the metal so much that aluminium begins to soften. This lower speed would also speed development and allow their design to fly before the Americans. Finally, everyone involved agreed that Küchemann's ogee shaped wing was the right one.

The only disagreements were over the size and range. The British team was still focused on a 150-passenger design serving transatlantic routes, while France was deliberately avoiding these. However, this proved not to be the barrier it might seem; common components could be used in both designs, with the shorter range version using a clipped fuselage and four engines, the longer one with a stretched fuselage and six engines, leaving only the wing to be extensively re-designed. The teams continued to meet through 1961, and by this time it was clear that the two aircraft would be considerably more similar in spite of different range and seating arrangements. A single design emerged that differed mainly in fuel load. More powerful Bristol Siddeley Olympus engines, being developed for the TSR-2, allowed either design to be powered by only four engines.

Cabinet response, treaty
While the development teams met, French Minister of Public Works and Transport Robert Buron was meeting with the UK Minister of Aviation Peter Thorneycroft, and Thorneycroft soon revealed to the cabinet that France was much more serious about a partnership than any of the US companies. The various US companies had proved uninterested in such a venture, likely due to the belief that the government would be funding development and would frown on any partnership with a European company, and the risk of "giving away" US technological leadership to a European partner.

When the STAC plans were presented to the UK cabinet, a negative reaction resulted. The economic considerations were considered highly questionable, especially as these were based on development costs, now estimated to be £150 million, which were repeatedly overrun in the industry. The Treasury Ministry in particular presented a very negative view, suggesting that there was no way the project would have any positive financial returns for the government, especially in light that "the industry's past record of over-optimistic estimating (including the recent history of the TSR.2) suggests that it would be prudent to consider the £150 million [cost] to turn out much too low."

This concern led to an independent review of the project by the Committee on Civil Scientific Research and Development, which met on topic between July and September 1962. The committee ultimately rejected the economic arguments, including considerations of supporting the industry made by Thorneycroft. Their report in October stated that it was unlikely there would be any direct positive economic outcome, but that the project should still be considered for the simple reason that everyone else was going supersonic, and they were concerned they would be locked out of future markets. Conversely, it appeared the project would not be likely to significantly affect other, more important, research efforts.

After considerable argument, the decision to proceed ultimately fell to an unlikely political expediency. At the time, the UK was pressing for admission to the European Economic Community, and this became the main rationale for moving ahead with the aircraft. The development project was negotiated as an international treaty between the two countries rather than a commercial agreement between companies and included a clause, originally asked for by the UK government, imposing heavy penalties for cancellation. This treaty was signed on 29 November 1962. Charles De Gaulle would soon veto the UK's entry into the European Community in a speech on 25 January 1963.

Naming
Reflecting the treaty between the British and French governments that led to Concorde's construction, the name Concorde is from the French word concorde, which has an English equivalent, concord. Both words mean agreement, harmony, or union. The name was officially changed to Concord by Harold Macmillan in response to a perceived slight by Charles de Gaulle. At the French roll-out in Toulouse in late 1967, the British Government Minister of Technology, Tony Benn, announced that he would change the spelling back to Concorde. This created a nationalist uproar that died down when Benn stated that the suffixed "e" represented "Excellence, England, Europe, and Entente (Cordiale)". In his memoirs, he recounts a tale of a letter from an irate Scotsman claiming: "[Y]ou talk about 'E' for England, but part of it is made in Scotland." Given Scotland's contribution of providing the nose cone for the aircraft, Benn replied, "[I]t was also 'E' for 'Écosse' (the French name for Scotland) – and I might have added 'e' for extravagance and 'e' for escalation as well!"

Concorde also acquired an unusual nomenclature for an aircraft. In common usage in the United Kingdom, the type is known as "Concorde" without an article, rather than " Concorde" or " Concorde".

Sales efforts

Described by Flight International as an "aviation icon" and "one of aerospace's most ambitious but commercially flawed projects", Concorde failed to meet its original sales targets, despite initial interest from several airlines.

At first, the new consortium intended to produce one long-range and one short-range version. However, prospective customers showed no interest in the short-range version and it was dropped.

A two-page advertisement for Concorde ran in the 29 May 1967 issue of Aviation Week & Space Technology which predicted a market for 350 aircraft by 1980 and boasted of Concorde's head start over the United States' SST project.

Concorde had considerable difficulties that led to its dismal sales performance. Costs had spiralled during development to more than six times the original projections, arriving at a unit cost of £23 million in 1977 (equivalent to £ million in ). Its sonic boom made travelling supersonically over land impossible without causing complaints from citizens. World events had also dampened Concorde sales prospects; the 1973–74 stock market crash and the 1973 oil crisis had made many airlines cautious about aircraft with high fuel consumption rates, and new wide-body aircraft, such as the Boeing 747, had recently made subsonic aircraft significantly more efficient and presented a low-risk option for airlines. While carrying a full load, Concorde achieved 15.8 passenger miles per gallon of fuel, while the Boeing 707 reached 33.3 pm/g, the Boeing 747 46.4 pm/g, and the McDonnell Douglas DC-10 53.6 pm/g. An emerging trend in the industry in favour of cheaper airline tickets had also caused airlines such as Qantas to question Concorde's market suitability.

The consortium received orders, i.e., non-binding options, for more than 100 of the long-range version from the major airlines of the day: Pan Am, BOAC, and Air France were the launch customers, with six Concordes each. Other airlines in the order book included Panair do Brasil, Continental Airlines, Japan Airlines, Lufthansa, American Airlines, United Airlines, Air India, Air Canada, Braniff, Singapore Airlines, Iran Air, Olympic Airways, Qantas, CAAC Airlines, Middle East Airlines, and TWA. At the time of the first flight the options list contained 74 options from 16 airlines:

Testing

The design work was supported by a preceding research programme studying the flight characteristics of low ratio delta wings. A supersonic Fairey Delta 2 was modified to carry the ogee planform, and, renamed as the BAC 221, used for flight tests of the high speed flight envelope, the Handley Page HP.115 also provided valuable information on low speed performance.

Construction of two prototypes began in February 1965: 001, built by Aérospatiale at Toulouse, and 002, by BAC at Filton, Bristol. Concorde 001 made its first test flight from Toulouse on 2 March 1969, piloted by André Turcat, and first went supersonic on 1 October. The first UK-built Concorde flew from Filton to RAF Fairford on 9 April 1969, piloted by Brian Trubshaw. Both prototypes were presented to the public for the first time on 7–8 June 1969 at the Paris Air Show. As the flight programme progressed, 001 embarked on a sales and demonstration tour on 4 September 1971, which was also the first transatlantic crossing of Concorde. Concorde 002 followed suit on 2 June 1972 with a tour of the Middle and Far East. Concorde 002 made the first visit to the United States in 1973, landing at the new Dallas/Fort Worth Regional Airport to mark that airport's opening.

While Concorde had initially held a great deal of customer interest, the project was hit by a large number of order cancellations. The Paris Le Bourget air show crash of the competing Soviet Tupolev Tu-144 had shocked potential buyers, and public concern over the environmental issues presented by a supersonic aircraft—the sonic boom, take-off noise and pollution—had produced a shift in public opinion of SSTs. By 1976 the remaining buyers were from four countries: Britain, France, China, and Iran. Only Air France and British Airways (the successor to BOAC) took up their orders, with the two governments taking a cut of any profits made.

The United States government cut federal funding for the Boeing 2707, its rival supersonic transport programme, in 1971; Boeing did not complete its two 2707 prototypes. The US, India, and Malaysia all ruled out Concorde supersonic flights over the noise concern, although some of these restrictions were later relaxed. Professor Douglas Ross characterised restrictions placed upon Concorde operations by President Jimmy Carter's administration as having been an act of protectionism of American aircraft manufacturers.

Programme cost
The original programme cost estimate was £70 million before 1962, (£ in ). The programme experienced huge cost overruns and delays, with the programme eventually costing between £1.5 and £2.1 billion in 1976, (£- in ). This extreme cost was the main reason the production run was much smaller than expected.
The per-unit cost was impossible to recoup, so the French and British governments absorbed the development costs.

Design

General features
Concorde is an ogival delta winged aircraft with four Olympus engines based on those employed in the RAF's Avro Vulcan strategic bomber. It is one of the few commercial aircraft to employ a tailless design (the Tupolev Tu-144 being another). Concorde was the first airliner to have a (in this case, analogue) fly-by-wire flight-control system; the avionics system Concorde used was unique because it was the first commercial aircraft to employ hybrid circuits. The principal designer for the project was Pierre Satre, with Sir Archibald Russell as his deputy.

Concorde pioneered the following technologies:

For high speed and optimisation of flight:
 Double delta (ogee/ogival) shaped wings
 Variable engine air intake ramp system controlled by digital computers
 Supercruise capability
 Thrust-by-wire engines, precursor of today's FADEC-controlled engines
 Droop nose for better landing visibility

For weight-saving and enhanced performance:
 Mainly aluminium construction using a high temperature alloy similar to that developed for aero-engine pistons. This material gave low weight and allowed conventional manufacture (higher speeds would have ruled out aluminium)
 Full-regime autopilot and autothrottle allowing "hands off" control of the aircraft from climb out to landing
 Fully electrically controlled analogue fly-by-wire flight controls systems
 High-pressure hydraulic system using  for lighter hydraulic components, tripled independent systems ("Blue", "Green", and "Yellow") for redundancy, with an emergency ram air turbine (RAT) stored in the port-inner elevon jack fairing supplying "Green" and "Yellow" as backup.
 Complex air data computer (ADC) for the automated monitoring and transmission of aerodynamic measurements (total pressure, static pressure, angle of attack, side-slip).
 Fully electrically controlled analogue brake-by-wire system
 Pitch trim by shifting fuel fore-and-aft for centre-of-gravity (CoG) control at the approach to Mach 1 and above with no drag penalty. Pitch trimming by fuel transfer had been used since 1958 on the B-58 supersonic bomber.
 Parts made using "sculpture milling", reducing the part count while saving weight and adding strength.
 No auxiliary power unit, as Concorde would only visit large airports where ground air start carts are available.

Powerplant

A symposium titled "Supersonic-Transport Implications" was hosted by the Royal Aeronautical Society on 8 December 1960. Various views were put forward on the likely type of powerplant for a supersonic transport, such as podded or buried installation and turbojet or ducted-fan engines. Boundary layer management in the podded installation was put forward as simpler with only an inlet cone but Dr. Seddon of the RAE saw "a future in a more sophisticated integration of shapes" in a buried installation. Another concern highlighted the case with two or more engines situated behind a single intake. An intake failure could lead to a double or triple engine failure. The advantage of the ducted fan over the turbojet was reduced airport noise but with considerable economic penalties with its larger cross-section producing excessive drag. At that time it was considered that the noise from a turbojet optimised for supersonic cruise could be reduced to an acceptable level using noise suppressors as used on subsonic jets.

The powerplant configuration selected for Concorde, and its development to a certificated design, can be seen in light of the above symposium topics (which highlighted airfield noise, boundary layer management and interactions between adjacent engines) and the requirement that the powerplant, at Mach 2, tolerate combinations of pushovers, sideslips, pull-ups and throttle slamming without surging. Extensive development testing with design changes and changes to intake and engine control laws would address most of the issues except airfield noise and the interaction between adjacent powerplants at speeds above Mach 1.6 which meant Concorde "had to be certified aerodynamically as a twin-engined aircraft above Mach 1.6".

Rolls-Royce had a design proposal, the RB.169, for the aircraft at the time of Concorde's initial design but "to develop a brand-new engine for Concorde would have been prohibitively expensive" so an existing engine, already flying in the supersonic BAC TSR-2 strike bomber prototype, was chosen. It was the BSEL Olympus Mk 320 turbojet, a development of the Bristol engine first used for the subsonic Avro Vulcan bomber.

Great confidence was placed in being able to reduce the noise of a turbojet and massive strides by SNECMA in silencer design were reported during the programme. However, by 1974 the spade silencers which projected into the exhaust were reported to be ineffective but "entry-into-service aircraft are likely to meet their noise guarantees". The Olympus Mk.622 with reduced jet velocity was proposed to reduce the noise but it was not developed.

Situated behind the leading edge of the wing, the engine intake had wing boundary layer ahead of it. Two-thirds was diverted and the remaining third which entered the intake did not adversely affect the intake efficiency except during pushovers when the boundary layer thickened ahead of the intake and caused surging. Extensive wind tunnel testing helped define leading edge modifications ahead of the intakes which solved the problem.

Each engine had its own intake and the engine nacelles were paired with a splitter plate between them to minimise adverse behaviour of one powerplant influencing the other. Only above  was an engine surge likely to affect the adjacent engine.

Concorde needed to fly long distances to be economically viable; this required high efficiency from the powerplant. Turbofan engines were rejected due to their larger cross-section producing excessive drag. Olympus turbojet technology was available to be developed to meet the design requirements of the aircraft, although turbofans would be studied for any future SST.

The aircraft used reheat (afterburners) only at take-off and to pass through the upper transonic regime to supersonic speeds, between Mach 0.95 and 1.7. Reheat was switched off at all other times. Due to jet engines being highly inefficient at low speeds, Concorde burned  of fuel (almost 2% of the maximum fuel load) taxiing to the runway. Fuel used was Jet A-1. Due to the high thrust produced even with the engines at idle, only the two outer engines were run after landing for easier taxiing and less brake pad wear – at low weights after landing, the aircraft would not remain stationary with all four engines idling requiring the brakes to be continuously applied to prevent the aircraft from rolling.

The air intake design for Concorde's engines was especially critical. The intakes had to slow down supersonic inlet air to subsonic speeds with high pressure recovery to ensure efficient operation at cruising speed while providing low distortion levels (to prevent engine surge) and maintaining high efficiency for all likely ambient temperatures to be met in cruise. They had to provide adequate subsonic performance for diversion cruise and low engine-face distortion at take-off. They also had to provide an alternative path for excess intake air during engine throttling or shutdowns. The variable intake features required to meet all these requirements consisted of front and rear ramps, a dump door, an auxiliary inlet and a ramp bleed to the exhaust nozzle.

As well as supplying air to the engine, the intake also supplied air through the ramp bleed to the propelling nozzle. The nozzle ejector (or aerodynamic) design, with variable exit area and secondary flow from the intake, contributed to good expansion efficiency from take-off to cruise.

Concorde's Air Intake Control Units (AICUs) made use of a digital processor to provide the necessary accuracy for intake control. It was the world's first use of a digital processor to be given full authority control of an essential system in a passenger aircraft. It was developed by the Electronics and Space Systems (ESS) division of the British Aircraft Corporation after it became clear that the analogue AICUs fitted to the prototype aircraft and developed by Ultra Electronics were found to be insufficiently accurate for the tasks in hand.

Engine failure causes problems on conventional subsonic aircraft; not only does the aircraft lose thrust on that side but the engine creates drag, causing the aircraft to yaw and bank in the direction of the failed engine. If this had happened to Concorde at supersonic speeds, it theoretically could have caused a catastrophic failure of the airframe. Although computer simulations predicted considerable problems, in practice Concorde could shut down both engines on the same side of the aircraft at Mach 2 without the predicted difficulties. During an engine failure the required air intake is virtually zero. So, on Concorde, engine failure was countered by the opening of the auxiliary spill door and the full extension of the ramps, which deflected the air downwards past the engine, gaining lift and minimising drag. Concorde pilots were routinely trained to handle double engine failure.

Concorde's thrust-by-wire engine control system was developed by Ultra Electronics.

Heating problems
Air compression on the outer surfaces caused the cabin to heat up during flight. Every surface, such as windows and panels, was warm to the touch by the end of the flight. Besides engines, the hottest part of the structure of any supersonic aircraft is the nose, due to aerodynamic heating. The engineers used Hiduminium R.R. 58, an aluminium alloy, throughout the aircraft because of its familiarity, cost and ease of construction. Concorde went through two cycles of heating and cooling during a flight, first cooling down as it gained altitude, then heating up after going supersonic. The reverse happened when descending and slowing down. This had to be factored into the metallurgical and fatigue modelling. A test rig was built that repeatedly heated up a full-size section of the wing, and then cooled it, and periodically samples of metal were taken for testing. The Concorde airframe was designed for a life of 45,000 flying hours.

The most obvious manifestation of this was a gap that opened up on the flight deck between the flight engineer's console and the bulkhead. On some aircraft that conducted a retiring supersonic flight, the flight engineers placed their caps in this expanded gap, wedging the cap when the airframe shrank again. To keep the cabin cool, Concorde used the fuel as a heat sink for the heat from the air conditioning. The same method also cooled the hydraulics. During supersonic flight the surfaces forward from the cockpit became heated, and a visor was used to deflect much of this heat from directly reaching the cockpit.

Concorde had livery restrictions; the majority of the surface had to be covered with a highly reflective white paint to avoid overheating the aluminium structure due to heating effects from supersonic flight at Mach 2. In 1996, Air France briefly painted F-BTSD in a predominantly blue livery, with the exception of the wings, in a promotional deal with Pepsi. F-BTSD was used because it was not scheduled for any long flights that required extended Mach 2 operations.

Structural issues

Due to its high speeds, large forces were applied to the aircraft during banks and turns, and caused twisting and distortion of the aircraft's structure. In addition there were concerns over maintaining precise control at supersonic speeds. Both of these issues were resolved by active ratio changes between the inboard and outboard elevons, varying at differing speeds including supersonic. Only the innermost elevons, which are attached to the stiffest area of the wings, were active at high speed. Additionally, the narrow fuselage meant that the aircraft flexed. This was visible from the rear passengers' viewpoints.

When any aircraft passes the critical mach of that particular airframe, the centre of pressure shifts rearwards. This causes a pitch down moment on the aircraft if the centre of gravity remains where it was. This could have been countered by the use of trim controls, but at such high speeds this would have dramatically increased drag. Instead, the distribution of fuel along the aircraft was shifted during acceleration and deceleration to move the centre of gravity, effectively acting as an auxiliary trim control.

Range
To fly non-stop across the Atlantic Ocean, Concorde required the greatest supersonic range of any aircraft. This was achieved by a combination of engines which were highly efficient at supersonic speeds, a slender fuselage with high fineness ratio, and a complex wing shape for a high lift-to-drag ratio. This also required carrying only a modest payload and a high fuel capacity, and the aircraft was trimmed to avoid unnecessary drag.

Nevertheless, soon after Concorde began flying, a Concorde "B" model was designed with slightly larger fuel capacity and slightly larger wings with leading edge slats to improve aerodynamic performance at all speeds, with the objective of expanding the range to reach markets in new regions. It featured more powerful engines with sound deadening and without the fuel-hungry and noisy afterburner. It was speculated that it was reasonably possible to create an engine with up to 25% gain in efficiency over the Rolls-Royce/Snecma Olympus 593. This would have given  additional range and a greater payload, making new commercial routes possible. This was cancelled due in part to poor sales of Concorde, but also to the rising cost of aviation fuel in the 1970s.

Radiation concerns

Concorde's high cruising altitude meant people on board received almost twice the flux of extraterrestrial ionising radiation as those travelling on a conventional long-haul flight. Upon Concorde's introduction, it was speculated that this exposure during supersonic travels would increase the likelihood of skin cancer. Due to the proportionally reduced flight time, the overall equivalent dose would normally be less than a conventional flight over the same distance. Unusual solar activity might lead to an increase in incident radiation. To prevent incidents of excessive radiation exposure, the flight deck had a radiometer and an instrument to measure the rate of increase or decrease of radiation. If the radiation level became too high, Concorde would descend below .

Cabin pressurisation
Airliner cabins were usually maintained at a pressure equivalent to  elevation. Concorde's pressurisation was set to an altitude at the lower end of this range, .

A sudden reduction in cabin pressure is hazardous to all passengers and crew. Above , a sudden cabin depressurisation would leave a "time of useful consciousness" up to 10–15 seconds for a conditioned athlete. At Concorde's altitude, the air density is very low; a breach of cabin integrity would result in a loss of pressure severe enough that the plastic emergency oxygen masks installed on other passenger jets would not be effective and passengers would soon suffer from hypoxia despite quickly donning them. Concorde was equipped with smaller windows to reduce the rate of loss in the event of a breach, a reserve air supply system to augment cabin air pressure, and a rapid descent procedure to bring the aircraft to a safe altitude. The FAA enforces minimum emergency descent rates for aircraft and noting Concorde's higher operating altitude, concluded that the best response to pressure loss would be a rapid descent. Continuous positive airway pressure would have delivered pressurised oxygen directly to the pilots through masks.

Flight characteristics

While subsonic commercial jets took eight hours to fly from Paris to New York (seven hours from New York to Paris), the average supersonic flight time on the transatlantic routes was just under 3.5 hours.

Due to the significantly less variable nature of high altitude winds compared to those at standard cruising altitudes, these dedicated SST tracks had fixed co-ordinates, unlike the standard routes at lower altitudes, whose co-ordinates are replotted twice daily based on forecast weather patterns (jetstreams). Concorde would also be cleared in a  block, allowing for a slow climb from  during the oceanic crossing as the fuel load gradually decreased. In regular service, Concorde employed an efficient cruise-climb flight profile following take-off.

The delta-shaped wings required Concorde to adopt a higher angle of attack at low speeds than conventional aircraft, but it allowed the formation of large low pressure vortices over the entire upper wing surface, maintaining lift. Because of this high angle, during a landing approach Concorde was on the "back side" of the drag force curve, where raising the nose would increase the rate of descent; the aircraft was thus largely flown on the throttle and was fitted with an autothrottle to reduce the pilot's workload.

Brakes and undercarriage

Because of the way Concorde's delta-wing generated lift, the undercarriage had to be unusually strong and tall to allow for the angle of attack at low speed. At rotation, Concorde would rise to a high angle of attack, about 18 degrees. Prior to rotation the wing generated almost no lift, unlike typical aircraft wings. Combined with the high airspeed at rotation ( indicated airspeed), this increased the stresses on the main undercarriage in a way that was initially unexpected during the development and required a major redesign. Due to the high angle needed at rotation, a small set of wheels was added aft to prevent tailstrikes. The main undercarriage units swing towards each other to be stowed but due to their great height also needed to contract in length telescopically before swinging to clear each other when stowed.

The starboard nose wheel carries a single disc brake to halt wheel rotation during retraction of the undercarriage. The port nose wheel carries speed generators for the anti-skid braking system which prevents brake activation until nose and main wheels rotate at the same rate.

Like most airliners, Concorde has anti-skid braking – a system which prevents the tyres from losing traction when the brakes are applied for greater control during roll-out. The brakes, developed by Dunlop, were the first carbon-based brakes used on an airliner. Each wheel has multiple discs which are cooled by electric fans. Wheel sensors include brake overload, brake temperature, and tyre deflation. Landing Concorde required a minimum of  runway length, this in fact being considerably less than the shortest runway Concorde ever actually landed on carrying commercial passengers, that of Cardiff Airport. Concorde G-AXDN (101), however, made its final landing at Duxford Aerodrome on 20 August 1977, which had a runway length of just  at the time. This was the final aircraft to land at Duxford before the runway was shortened later that year.

Droop nose

Concorde's drooping nose, developed by Marshall's of Cambridge, enabled the aircraft to switch from being streamlined to reduce drag and achieve optimal aerodynamic efficiency during flight, to not obstructing the pilot's view during taxi, take-off, and landing operations. Due to the high angle of attack, the long pointed nose obstructed the view and necessitated the ability to droop. The droop nose was accompanied by a moving visor that retracted into the nose prior to being lowered. When the nose was raised to horizontal, the visor would rise in front of the cockpit windscreen for aerodynamic streamlining.

A controller in the cockpit allowed the visor to be retracted and the nose to be lowered to 5° below the standard horizontal position for taxiing and take-off. Following take-off and after clearing the airport, the nose and visor were raised. Prior to landing, the visor was again retracted and the nose lowered to 12.5° below horizontal for maximal visibility. Upon landing the nose was raised to the 5° position to avoid the possibility of damage due to collision with ground vehicles, and then raised fully before engine shutdown to prevent pooling of internal condensation within the radome seeping down into the aircraft's pitot/ADC system probes.

The US Federal Aviation Administration had objected to the restrictive visibility of the visor used on the first two prototype Concordes, which had been designed before a suitable high-temperature window glass had become available, and thus requiring alteration before the FAA would permit Concorde to serve US airports. This led to the redesigned visor used on the production and the four pre-production aircraft (101, 102, 201, and 202).

Operational history

1973 Solar Eclipse Mission
Concorde 001 was modified with rooftop portholes for use on the 1973 Solar Eclipse mission and equipped with observation instruments. It performed the longest observation of a solar eclipse to date, about 74 minutes.

Scheduled flights

Scheduled flights began on 21 January 1976 on the London–Bahrain and Paris–Rio de Janeiro (via Dakar) routes, with BA flights using the Speedbird Concorde call sign to notify air traffic control of the aircraft's unique abilities and restrictions, but the French using their normal call signs. The Paris-Caracas route (via Azores) began on 10 April. The US Congress had just banned Concorde landings in the US, mainly due to citizen protest over sonic booms, preventing launch on the coveted North Atlantic routes. The US Secretary of Transportation, William Coleman, gave permission for Concorde service to Washington Dulles International Airport, and Air France and British Airways simultaneously began a thrice-weekly service to Dulles on 24 May 1976. Due to low demand, Air France cancelled its Washington service in October 1982, while British Airways cancelled it in November 1994.

When the US ban on JFK Concorde operations was lifted in February 1977, New York banned Concorde locally. The ban came to an end on 17 October 1977 when the Supreme Court of the United States declined to overturn a lower court's ruling rejecting efforts by the Port Authority of New York and New Jersey and a grass-roots campaign led by Carol Berman to continue the ban. In spite of complaints about noise, the noise report noted that Air Force One, at the time a Boeing VC-137, was louder than Concorde at subsonic speeds and during take-off and landing. Scheduled service from Paris and London to New York's John F. Kennedy Airport began on 22 November 1977.

In December 1977, British Airways and Singapore Airlines started sharing a Concorde for flights between London and Singapore International Airport at Paya Lebar via Bahrain. The aircraft, BA's Concorde G-BOAD, was painted in Singapore Airlines livery on the port side and British Airways livery on the starboard side. The service was discontinued after three return flights because of noise complaints from the Malaysian government; it could only be reinstated on a new route bypassing Malaysian airspace in 1979. A dispute with India prevented Concorde from reaching supersonic speeds in Indian airspace, so the route was eventually declared not viable and discontinued in 1980.

During the Mexican oil boom, Air France flew Concorde twice weekly to Mexico City's Benito Juárez International Airport via Washington, DC, or New York City, from September 1978 to November 1982. The worldwide economic crisis during that period resulted in this route's cancellation; the last flights were almost empty. The routing between Washington or New York and Mexico City included a deceleration, from Mach 2.02 to Mach 0.95, to cross Florida subsonically and avoid creating a sonic boom over the state; Concorde then re-accelerated back to high speed while crossing the Gulf of Mexico. On 1 April 1989, on an around-the-world luxury tour charter, British Airways implemented changes to this routing that allowed G-BOAF to maintain Mach 2.02 by passing around Florida to the east and south. Periodically Concorde visited the region on similar chartered flights to Mexico City and Acapulco.

From December 1978 to May 1980, Braniff International Airways leased 11 Concordes, five from Air France and six from British Airways. These were used on subsonic flights between Dallas–Fort Worth and Washington Dulles International Airport, flown by Braniff flight crews. Air France and British Airways crews then took over for the continuing supersonic flights to London and Paris. The aircraft were registered in both the United States and their home countries; the European registration was covered while being operated by Braniff, retaining full AF/BA liveries. The flights were not profitable and typically less than 50% booked, forcing Braniff to end its tenure as the only US Concorde operator in May 1980.

In its early years, the British Airways Concorde service had a greater number of "no shows" (passengers who booked a flight and then failed to appear at the gate for boarding) than any other aircraft in the fleet.

British Caledonian interest
Following the launch of British Airways Concorde services, Britain's other major airline, British Caledonian (BCal), set up a task force headed by Gordon Davidson, BA's former Concorde director, to investigate the possibility of their own Concorde operations. This was seen as particularly viable for the airline's long-haul network as there were two unsold aircraft then available for purchase.

One important reason for BCal's interest in Concorde was that the British Government's 1976 aviation policy review had opened the possibility of BA setting up supersonic services in competition with BCal's established sphere of influence. To counteract this potential threat, BCal considered their own independent Concorde plans, as well as a partnership with BA. BCal were considered most likely to have set up a Concorde service on the Gatwick–Lagos route, a major source of revenue and profits within BCal's scheduled route network; BCal's Concorde task force did assess the viability of a daily supersonic service complementing the existing subsonic widebody service on this route.

BCal entered into a bid to acquire at least one Concorde. However, BCal eventually arranged for two aircraft to be leased from BA and Aérospatiale respectively, to be maintained by either BA or Air France. BCal's envisaged two-Concorde fleet would have required a high level of aircraft usage to be cost-effective; therefore, BCal had decided to operate the second aircraft on a supersonic service between Gatwick and Atlanta, with a stopover at either Gander or Halifax. Consideration was given to services to Houston and various points on its South American network at a later stage. Both supersonic services were to be launched at some point during 1980; however, steeply rising oil prices caused by the 1979 energy crisis led to BCal shelving their supersonic ambitions.

British Airways buys its Concordes outright
By around 1981 in the UK, the future for Concorde looked bleak. The British government had lost money operating Concorde every year, and moves were afoot to cancel the service entirely. A cost projection came back with greatly reduced metallurgical testing costs because the test rig for the wings had built up enough data to last for 30 years and could be shut down. Despite this, the government was not keen to continue. In 1983, BA's managing director, Sir John King, convinced the government to sell the aircraft outright to the then state-owned British Airways for £16.5 million plus the first year's profits. In 2003, Lord Heseltine, who was the minister responsible at the time, revealed to Alan Robb on BBC Radio 5 Live, that the aircraft had been sold for "next to nothing". Asked by Robb if it was the worst deal ever negotiated by a government minister, he replied "That is probably right. But if you have your hands tied behind your back and no cards and a very skillful negotiator on the other side of the table... I defy you to do any [better]." British Airways was subsequently privatised in 1987.

Operating economics
Its estimated operating costs were $3,800 per block hour in 1972, compared to actual 1971 operating costs of $1,835 for a 707 and $3,500 for a 747 (equivalent to $ and $, respectively); for a  London–New York sector, a 707 cost $13,750 or 3.04¢ per seat/nmi (in 1971 dollars), a 747 $26,200 or 2.4¢ per seat/nmi and Concorde $14,250 or 4.5¢ per seat/nmi.

In 1983, Pan American accused the British Government of subsidising British Airways Concorde air fares, on which a return London–New York was £2,399 (£ in  prices), compared to £1,986 (£) with a subsonic first class return, and London–Washington return was £2,426 (£) instead of £2,258 (£) subsonic.

Concorde's unit cost was then $33.8 million ($ in  dollars).
British Airways and Air France benefited from a significantly reduced purchase price from the manufacturing consortium via their respective governments.

The speed and premium service were relatively costly: in 1997, the round-trip ticket price from New York to London was $7,995 (equivalent to $ in ), more than 30 times the cost of the least expensive scheduled flight for this route, however when compared with subsonic First Class on the same route, return tickets were only about 10-15% more expensive while flight time was cut in half.

After on and off profitability, in 1982 Concorde was established in its own operating division (Concorde Division) under Capt. Brian Walpole and Capt. Jock Lowe Their research revealed that passengers thought that the fare was higher than it actually was, so the airline raised ticket prices to match these perceptions. and following the successful marketing research and repositioning, ran profitably for British Airways. The ticket price was pitched above subsonic First Class but not as much as might be expected. In 1996 the Concorde return fare was GBP 4,772 compared to 4,314 for subsonic First Class, adding to its corporate appeal. It developed a loyal following and earned over half a billion GBP in profit over the next 20 years with (typically) just 5 aircraft operating and 2 in various maintenance cycles.

Other services
Between March 1984 and January 1991, British Airways flew a thrice-weekly Concorde service between London and Miami, stopping at Washington Dulles International Airport. Until 2003, Air France and British Airways continued to operate the New York services daily. From 1987 to 2003 British Airways flew a Saturday morning Concorde service to Grantley Adams International Airport, Barbados, during the summer and winter holiday season.

Prior to the Air France Paris crash, several UK and French tour operators operated charter flights to European destinations on a regular basis; the charter business was viewed as lucrative by British Airways and Air France.

In 1997, British Airways held a promotional contest to mark the 10th anniversary of the airline's move into the private sector. The promotion was a lottery to fly to New York held for 190 tickets valued at £5,400 each, to be offered at £10. Contestants had to call a special hotline to compete with up to 20 million people.

Retirement

On 10 April 2003, Air France and British Airways simultaneously announced they would retire Concorde later that year. They cited low passenger numbers following the 25 July 2000 crash, the slump in air travel following the September 11 attacks, and rising maintenance costs: Airbus, the company that acquired Aérospatiale in 2000, had made a decision in 2003 to no longer supply replacement parts for the aircraft. Although Concorde was technologically advanced when introduced in the 1970s, 30 years later, its analogue cockpit was outdated. There had been little commercial pressure to upgrade Concorde due to a lack of competing aircraft, unlike other airliners of the same era such as the Boeing 747. By its retirement, it was the last aircraft in the British Airways fleet that had a flight engineer; other aircraft, such as the modernised 747-400, had eliminated the role.

On 11 April 2003, Virgin Atlantic founder Sir Richard Branson announced that the company was interested in purchasing British Airways' Concorde fleet "for the same price that they were given them for – one pound". British Airways dismissed the idea, prompting Virgin to increase their offer to £1 million each. Branson claimed that when BA was privatised, a clause in the agreement required them to allow another British airline to operate Concorde if BA ceased to do so, but the Government denied the existence of such a clause. In October 2003, Branson wrote in The Economist that his final offer was "over £5 million" and that he had intended to operate the fleet "for many years to come". The chances for keeping Concorde in service were stifled by Airbus's lack of support for continued maintenance.

It has been suggested that Concorde was not withdrawn for the reasons usually given but that it became apparent during the grounding of Concorde that the airlines could make more profit carrying first-class passengers subsonically. A lack of commitment to Concorde from Director of Engineering Alan MacDonald was cited as having undermined BA's resolve to continue operating Concorde.

Other reasons why the attempted revival of Concorde never happened relate to the fact that the narrow fuselage did not allow for "luxury" features of subsonic air travel such as moving space, reclining seats and overall comfort. In the words of The Guardian's Dave Hall, "Concorde was an outdated notion of prestige that left sheer speed the only luxury of supersonic travel."

The general downturn in the commercial aviation industry after the September 11 attacks in 2001 and the end of maintenance support for Concorde by Airbus, the successor to Aérospatiale, contributed to the aircraft's retirement.

Air France

Air France made its final commercial Concorde landing in the United States in New York City from Paris on 30 May 2003. Air France's final Concorde flight took place on 27 June 2003 when F-BVFC retired to Toulouse.

An auction of Concorde parts and memorabilia for Air France was held at Christie's in Paris on 15 November 2003; 1,300 people attended, and several lots exceeded their predicted values. French Concorde F-BVFC was retired to Toulouse and kept functional for a short time after the end of service, in case taxi runs were required in support of the French judicial enquiry into the 2000 crash. The aircraft is now fully retired and no longer functional.

French Concorde F-BTSD has been retired to the "Musée de l'Air" at Paris–Le Bourget Airport near Paris; unlike the other museum Concordes, a few of the systems are being kept functional. For instance, the famous "droop nose" can still be lowered and raised. This led to rumours that they could be prepared for future flights for special occasions.

French Concorde F-BVFB is at the Auto & Technik Museum Sinsheim at Sinsheim, Germany, after its last flight from Paris to Baden-Baden, followed by a spectacular transport to Sinsheim via barge and road. The museum also has a Tupolev Tu-144 on display – this is the only place where both supersonic airliners can be seen together.

In 1989, Air France signed a letter of agreement to donate a Concorde to the National Air and Space Museum in Washington D.C. upon the aircraft's retirement. On 12 June 2003, Air France honoured that agreement, donating Concorde F-BVFA (serial 205) to the museum upon the completion of its last flight. This aircraft was the first Air France Concorde to open service to Rio de Janeiro, Washington, D.C., and New York and had flown 17,824 hours. It is on display at the Smithsonian's Steven F. Udvar-Hazy Center at Dulles Airport.

British Airways

British Airways conducted a North American farewell tour in October 2003. G-BOAG visited Toronto Pearson International Airport on 1 October, after which it flew to New York's John F. Kennedy International Airport. G-BOAD visited Boston's Logan International Airport on 8 October, and G-BOAG visited Washington Dulles International Airport on 14 October.

In a week of farewell flights around the United Kingdom, Concorde visited Birmingham on 20 October, Belfast on 21 October, Manchester on 22 October, Cardiff on 23 October, and Edinburgh on 24 October. Each day the aircraft made a return flight out and back into Heathrow to the cities, often overflying them at low altitude. On 22 October, both Concorde flight BA9021C, a special from Manchester, and BA002 from New York landed simultaneously on both of Heathrow's runways. On 23 October 2003, the Queen consented to the illumination of Windsor Castle, an honour reserved for state events and visiting dignitaries, as Concorde's last west-bound commercial flight departed London.

British Airways retired its Concorde fleet on 24 October 2003. G-BOAG left New York to a fanfare similar to that given for Air France's F-BTSD, while two more made round trips, G-BOAF over the Bay of Biscay, carrying VIP guests including former Concorde pilots, and G-BOAE to Edinburgh. The three aircraft then circled over London, having received special permission to fly at low altitude, before landing in sequence at Heathrow. The captain of the New York to London flight was Mike Bannister. The final flight of a Concorde in the US occurred on 5 November 2003 when G-BOAG flew from New York's JFK Airport to Seattle's Boeing Field to join the Museum of Flight's permanent collection. The plane was piloted by Mike Bannister and Les Broadie, who claimed a flight time of three hours, 55 minutes and 12 seconds, a record between the two cities that was made possible by Canada granting use of a supersonic corridor between Chibougamau, Quebec, and Peace River, Alberta. The museum had been pursuing a Concorde for their collection since 1984. The final flight of a Concorde worldwide took place on 26 November 2003 with a landing at Filton, Bristol, UK.

All of BA's Concorde fleet have been grounded, drained of hydraulic fluid and their airworthiness certificates withdrawn. Jock Lowe, ex-chief Concorde pilot and manager of the fleet, estimated in 2004 that it would cost £10–15 million to make G-BOAF airworthy again. BA maintain ownership and have stated that they will not fly again due to a lack of support from Airbus. On 1 December 2003, Bonhams held an auction of British Airways Concorde artefacts, including a nose cone, at Kensington Olympia in London. Proceeds of around £750,000 were raised, with the majority going to charity. G-BOAD is currently on display at the Intrepid Sea, Air & Space Museum in New York. In 2007, BA announced that the advertising spot at Heathrow where a 40% scale model of Concorde was located would not be retained; the model is now on display at the Brooklands Museum, in Surrey, England.

Displays and restoration
Concorde G-BBDG was used for test flying and trials work. It was retired in 1981 and then only used for spares. It was dismantled and transported by road from Filton to the Brooklands Museum, where it was restored from essentially a shell. It remains open to visitors to the museum, and wears the original Negus & Negus livery worn by the Concorde fleet during their initial years of service with BA.

Concorde G-BOAB, call sign Alpha Bravo, was never modified and returned to service with the rest of British Airways' fleet, and has remained at London Heathrow Airport since its final flight, a ferry flight from JFK in 2000. Although the aircraft was effectively retired, G-BOAB was used as a test aircraft for the Project Rocket interiors that were in the process of being added to the rest of BA's fleet. G-BOAB has been towed around Heathrow on various occasions; it currently occupies a space on the airport's apron and is regularly visible to aircraft moving around the airport.

One of the youngest Concordes (F-BTSD) is on display at Le Bourget Air and Space Museum in Paris. In February 2010, it was announced that the museum and a group of volunteer Air France technicians intend to restore F-BTSD so it can taxi under its own power. In May 2010, it was reported that the British Save Concorde Group and French Olympus 593 groups had begun inspecting the engines of a Concorde at the French museum; their intent was to restore the airliner to a condition where it could fly in demonstrations.

G-BOAF forms the centrepiece of the Aerospace Bristol museum at Filton, which opened to the public in 2017.

G-BOAD, the aircraft that holds the record for the Heathrow – JFK crossing at 2 hours, 52 minutes, and 59 seconds, is on display at the Intrepid Sea, Air & Space Museum in New York.

Operators
 Air France
 British Airways
 Braniff International Airways operated Concordes between Washington/Dulles and Dallas/Ft. Worth international airports, utilizing its own flight and cabin crew, under its own insurance and operator's license. Stickers containing a US registration were placed over the French and British registrations of the aircraft during each rotation, and a placard was temporarily placed behind the cockpit to signify the operator and operator's license in command.
 Singapore Airlines had its livery placed on the left side of Concorde G-BOAD, and held a joint marketing agreement which saw Singapore insignias on the cabin fittings, as well as the airline's "Singapore Girl" stewardesses jointly sharing cabin duty with British Airways flight attendants. All flight crew, operations, and insurances remained solely under British Airways however, and at no point did Singapore Airlines operate Concorde services under its own operator's certification, nor wet-lease an aircraft. This arrangement initially only lasted for three flights, conducted between 9–13 December 1977; it later resumed on 24 January 1979, and operated until 1 November 1980. The Singapore livery was used on G-BOAD from 1977 to 1980.

Accidents and incidents

Air France Flight 4590

On 25 July 2000, Air France Flight 4590, registration F-BTSC, crashed in Gonesse, France, after departing from Charles de Gaulle Airport en route to John F. Kennedy International Airport in New York City, killing all 100 passengers and nine crew members on board as well as four people on the ground. It was the only fatal accident involving Concorde. This crash also damaged Concorde's reputation and caused both British Airways and Air France to temporarily ground their fleets until modifications that involved strengthening the affected areas of the aircraft had been made.

According to the official investigation conducted by the Bureau of Enquiry and Analysis for Civil Aviation Safety (BEA), the crash was caused by a metallic strip that had fallen from a Continental Airlines DC-10 that had taken off minutes earlier. This fragment punctured a tyre on Concorde's left main wheel bogie during take-off. The tyre exploded, and a piece of rubber hit the fuel tank, which caused a fuel leak and led to a fire. The crew shut down engine number 2 in response to a fire warning, and with engine number 1 surging and producing little power, the aircraft was unable to gain altitude or speed. The aircraft entered a rapid pitch-up then a sudden descent, rolling left and crashing tail-low into the Hôtelissimo Les Relais Bleus Hotel in Gonesse.

The claim that a metallic strip caused the crash was disputed during the trial both by witnesses (including the pilot of then French President Jacques Chirac's aircraft that had just landed on an adjacent runway when Flight 4590 caught fire) and by an independent French TV investigation that found a wheel spacer had not been installed in the left-side main gear and that the plane caught fire some 1,000 feet from where the metallic strip lay. British investigators and former French Concorde pilots looked at several other possibilities that the BEA report ignored, including an unbalanced weight distribution in the fuel tanks and loose landing gear. They came to the conclusion that the Concorde veered off course on the runway, which reduced takeoff speed below the crucial minimum. John Hutchinson, who had served as a Concorde captain for 15 years with British Airways, said "the fire on its own should have been 'eminently survivable; the pilot should have been able to fly his way out of trouble'", had it not been for a "lethal combination of operational error and 'negligence' by the maintenance department of Air France" that "nobody wants to talk about".

On 6 December 2010, Continental Airlines and John Taylor, a mechanic who installed the metal strip, were found guilty of involuntary manslaughter; however, on 30 November 2012, a French court overturned the conviction, saying mistakes by Continental and Taylor did not make them criminally responsible. 

Before the accident, Concorde had been arguably the safest operational passenger airliner in the world with zero passenger deaths-per-kilometres travelled; but there had been two prior non-fatal accidents and a rate of tyre damage some 30 times higher than subsonic airliners from 1995 to 2000. Safety improvements were made in the wake of the crash, including more secure electrical controls, Kevlar lining on the fuel tanks and specially developed burst-resistant tyres. The first flight with the modifications departed from London Heathrow on 17 July 2001, piloted by BA Chief Concorde Pilot Mike Bannister. During the 3-hour 20-minute flight over the mid-Atlantic towards Iceland, Bannister attained Mach 2.02 and  before returning to RAF Brize Norton. The test flight, intended to resemble the London–New York route, was declared a success and was watched on live TV, and by crowds on the ground at both locations.

The first flight with passengers after the 2000 grounding for safety modifications landed shortly before the World Trade Center attacks in the United States. This was not a commercial flight: all the passengers were BA employees. Normal commercial operations resumed on 7 November 2001 by BA and AF (aircraft G-BOAE and F-BTSD), with service to New York JFK, where Mayor Rudy Giuliani greeted the passengers.

Other accidents and incidents

Concorde had suffered two previous non-fatal accidents that were similar to each other.
 12 April 1989: A Concorde of British registration, G-BOAF, on a chartered flight from Christchurch, New Zealand, to Sydney, suffered a structural failure in-flight at supersonic speed. As the aircraft was climbing and accelerating through Mach 1.7, a "thud" was heard. The crew did not notice any handling problems, and they assumed the thud they heard was a minor engine surge. No further difficulty was encountered until descent through  at Mach 1.3, when a vibration was felt throughout the aircraft, lasting two to three minutes. Most of the upper rudder had become separated from the aircraft at this point. Aircraft handling was unaffected, and the aircraft made a safe landing at Sydney. The UK's Air Accidents Investigation Branch (AAIB) concluded that the skin of the rudder had been separating from the rudder structure over a period of time before the accident due to moisture seepage past the rivets in the rudder. Furthermore, production staff had not followed proper procedures during an earlier modification of the rudder, but the procedures were difficult to adhere to. The aircraft was repaired and returned to service.
 21 March 1992: British Airways Flight 01, G-BOAB, on a scheduled flight from London to New York, also suffered a structural failure in-flight at supersonic speed. No difficulties in handling were noticed, and no instruments gave any irregular indications. This crew also suspected there had been a minor engine surge. One hour later, during descent and while decelerating below Mach 1.4, a sudden "severe" vibration began throughout the aircraft. The vibration worsened when power was added to the No 2 engine, and it was attenuated when that engine's power was reduced. The crew shut down the No 2 engine and made a successful landing in New York, noting only that increased rudder control was needed to keep the aircraft on its intended approach course. Again, the skin had become separated from the structure of the rudder, which led to most of the upper rudder becoming separated in-flight. The AAIB concluded that repair materials had leaked into the structure of the rudder during a recent repair, weakening the bond between the skin and the structure of the rudder, leading to it breaking up in-flight. The large size of the repair had made it difficult to keep repair materials out of the structure, and prior to this accident, the severity of the effect of these repair materials on the structure and skin of the rudder was not appreciated.
 The 2010 trial involving Continental Airlines over the crash of Flight 4590 established that from 1976 until Flight 4590 there had been 57 tyre failures involving Concordes during takeoffs, including a near-crash at Dulles Airport on 14 June 1979 involving Air France Flight 54 where a tyre blowout pierced the plane's fuel tank and damaged the port-side engine and electrical cables, with the loss of two of the craft's hydraulic systems.

Aircraft on display

Of the 20 aircraft built, 18 remain, with 16 open to the public. G-BOAB is at London Heathrow airport but is adjacent to a taxiway and inaccessible. It has been stripped of its interior and is ballasted. G-BOAG is at Grantley Adams Airport in Barbados and was open to the public. However, the Concorde Experience in Barbados has been closed since 2017 with no indication of when or if it will re-open.

Comparable aircraft

Tu-144

Concorde is one of only two supersonic jetliner models to operate commercially; the other is the Soviet-built Tupolev Tu-144, which operated in the late 1970s.
The Tu-144 was nicknamed "Concordski" by Western European journalists for its outward similarity to Concorde. It had been alleged that Soviet espionage efforts had resulted in the theft of Concorde blueprints, supposedly to assist in the design of the Tu-144. As a result of a rushed development programme, the first Tu-144 prototype was substantially different from the preproduction machines, but both were cruder than Concorde. The Tu-144S had a significantly shorter range than Concorde. Jean Rech, Sud Aviation, attributed this to two things, a very heavy powerplant with an intake twice as long as that on Concorde, and low-bypass turbofan engines with too-high a bypass ratio which needed afterburning for cruise. The aircraft had poor control at low speeds because of a simpler supersonic wing design. In addition the Tu-144 required braking parachutes to land while Concorde used anti-lock brakes. The Tu-144 had two crashes, one at the 1973 Paris Air Show, and another during a pre-delivery test flight in May 1978.

The later production Tu-144 versions were more refined and competitive. The Tu-144D had Kolesov RD-36-51 turbojet engines providing greater fuel efficiency, cruising speed and a maximum range of 6,500 km, near Concorde's maximum range of 6,667 km. Passenger service commenced in November 1977, but after the 1978 crash the aircraft was taken out of passenger service after only 55 flights, which carried an average of 58 passengers. The Tu-144 had an inherently unsafe structural design as a consequence of an automated production method chosen to simplify and speed up manufacturing. The Tu-144 program was cancelled by the Soviet government on 1 July 1983.

SST and others

The main competing designs for the US government-funded SST were the swing-wing Boeing 2707 and the compound delta wing Lockheed L-2000. These were to have been larger, with seating for up to 300 people. The Boeing 2707 was selected for development. Concorde first flew in 1969, the year Boeing began building 2707 mockups after changing the design to a cropped delta wing; the cost of this and other changes helped to kill the project. The operation of US military aircraft such as the Mach 3+ North American XB-70 Valkyrie prototypes and Convair B-58 Hustler strategic nuclear bomber had shown that sonic booms were quite capable of reaching the ground, and the experience from the Oklahoma City sonic boom tests led to the same environmental concerns that hindered the commercial success of Concorde. The American government cancelled its SST project in 1971 having spent more than $1 billion without any aircraft being built.

Impact

Environmental
Before Concorde's flight trials, developments in the civil aviation industry were largely accepted by governments and their respective electorates. Opposition to Concorde's noise, particularly on the east coast of the United States, forged a new political agenda on both sides of the Atlantic, with scientists and technology experts across a multitude of industries beginning to take the environmental and social impact more seriously. Although Concorde led directly to the introduction of a general noise abatement programme for aircraft flying out of John F. Kennedy Airport, many found that Concorde was quieter than expected, partly due to the pilots temporarily throttling back their engines to reduce noise during overflight of residential areas. Even before commercial flights started, it had been claimed that Concorde was quieter than many other aircraft. In 1971, BAC's technical director was quoted as saying, "It is certain on present evidence and calculations that in the airport context, production Concordes will be no worse than aircraft now in service and will in fact be better than many of them."

Concorde produced nitrogen oxides in its exhaust, which, despite complicated interactions with other ozone-depleting chemicals, are understood to result in degradation to the ozone layer at the stratospheric altitudes it cruised. It has been pointed out that other, lower-flying, airliners produce ozone during their flights in the troposphere, but vertical transit of gases between the layers is restricted. The small fleet meant overall ozone-layer degradation caused by Concorde was negligible. In 1995, David Fahey, of the National Oceanic and Atmospheric Administration in the United States, warned that a fleet of 500 supersonic aircraft with exhausts similar to Concorde might produce a 2 percent drop in global ozone levels, much higher than previously thought. Each 1 percent drop in ozone is estimated to increase the incidence of non-melanoma skin cancer worldwide by 2 percent. Dr Fahey said if these particles are produced by highly oxidised sulphur in the fuel, as he believed, then removing sulphur in the fuel will reduce the ozone-destroying impact of supersonic transport.

Concorde's technical leap forward boosted the public's understanding of conflicts between technology and the environment as well as awareness of the complex decision analysis processes that surround such conflicts. In France, the use of acoustic fencing alongside TGV tracks might not have been achieved without the 1970s controversy over aircraft noise. In the UK, the CPRE has issued tranquillity maps since 1990.

Public perception

Concorde was normally perceived as a privilege of the rich, but special circular or one-way (with return by other flight or ship) charter flights were arranged to bring a trip within the means of moderately well-off enthusiasts.

The aircraft was usually referred to by the British as simply "Concorde". In France it was known as "le Concorde" due to "le", the definite article, used in French grammar to introduce the name of a ship or aircraft, and the capital being used to distinguish a proper name from a common noun of the same spelling. In French, the common noun concorde means "agreement, harmony, or peace".  Concorde's pilots and British Airways in official publications often refer to Concorde both in the singular and plural as "she" or "her".

As a symbol of national pride, an example from the BA fleet made occasional flypasts at selected Royal events, major air shows and other special occasions, sometimes in formation with the Red Arrows. On the final day of commercial service, public interest was so great that grandstands were erected at Heathrow Airport. Significant numbers of people attended the final landings; the event received widespread media coverage.

In 2006, 37 years after its first test flight, Concorde was announced the winner of the Great British Design Quest organised by the BBC and the Design Museum. A total of 212,000 votes were cast with Concorde beating other British design icons such as the Mini, mini skirt, Jaguar E-Type, Tube map, the World Wide Web, K2 telephone box and the Supermarine Spitfire.

Special missions

The heads of France and the United Kingdom flew in Concorde many times. Presidents Georges Pompidou, Valéry Giscard d'Estaing and François Mitterrand regularly used Concorde as French flagman aircraft in foreign visits. Queen Elizabeth II and Prime Ministers Edward Heath, Jim Callaghan, Margaret Thatcher, John Major and Tony Blair took Concorde in some charter flights such as the Queen's trips to Barbados on her Silver Jubilee in 1977, in 1987 and in 2003, to the Middle East in 1984 and to the United States in 1991. Pope John Paul II flew on Concorde in May 1989.

Concorde sometimes made special flights for demonstrations, air shows (such as the Farnborough, Paris-LeBourget, Oshkosh AirVenture and MAKS air shows) as well as parades and celebrations (for example, of Zurich Airport's anniversary in 1998). The aircraft were also used for private charters (including by the President of Zaire Mobutu Sese Seko on multiple occasions), for advertising companies (including for the firm OKI), for Olympic torch relays (1992 Winter Olympics in Albertville) and for observing solar eclipses, including the solar eclipse of 30 June 1973 and again for the total solar eclipse on 11 August 1999.

Records
The fastest transatlantic airliner flight was from New York JFK to London Heathrow on 7 February 1996 by the British Airways G-BOAD in 2 hours, 52 minutes, 59 seconds from take-off to touchdown aided by a 175 mph (282 km/h) tailwind. On 13 February 1985, a Concorde charter flight flew from London Heathrow to Sydney—on the opposite side of the world—in a time of 17 hours, 3 minutes and 45 seconds, including refuelling stops.

Concorde set the FAI "Westbound Around the World" and "Eastbound Around the World" world air speed records. On 12–13 October 1992, in commemoration of the 500th anniversary of Columbus' first voyage to the New World, Concorde Spirit Tours (US) chartered Air France Concorde F-BTSD and circumnavigated the world in 32 hours 49 minutes and 3 seconds, from Lisbon, Portugal, including six refuelling stops at Santo Domingo, Acapulco, Honolulu, Guam, Bangkok, and Bahrain.

The eastbound record was set by the same Air France Concorde (F-BTSD) under charter to Concorde Spirit Tours in the US on 15–16 August 1995. This promotional flight circumnavigated the world from New York/JFK International Airport in 31 hours 27 minutes 49 seconds, including six refuelling stops at Toulouse, Dubai, Bangkok, Andersen AFB in Guam, Honolulu, and Acapulco. By its 30th flight anniversary on 2 March 1999 Concorde had clocked up 920,000 flight hours, with more than 600,000 supersonic, many more than all of the other supersonic aircraft in the Western world combined.

On its way to the Museum of Flight in November 2003, G-BOAG set a New York City-to-Seattle speed record of 3 hours, 55 minutes, and 12 seconds. Due to the restrictions on supersonic overflights within the US the flight was granted permission by the Canadian authorities for the majority of the journey to be flown supersonically over sparsely-populated Canadian territory.

Specifications

Notable appearances in media

See also

 Barbara Harmer, the first qualified female Concorde pilot
 Museo del Concorde, a former museum dedicated to the airliner

Notes

References

Citations

Bibliography
  
 
 
 
 
 
 
 
 .

External links

Legacy
 British Airways Concorde page
 BAC Concorde at BAE Systems site
 Design Museum (UK) Concorde page
 Heritage Concorde preservation group site

Articles

Videos

 "Video: Roll-out." British Movietone/Associated Press. 14 December 1967, posted online on 21 July 2015.
 "This plane could cross the Atlantic in 3.5 hours. Why did it fail?." Vox Media. 19 July 2016.

 
Air France–KLM
British Airways
British Aircraft Corporation aircraft
Tailless delta-wing aircraft
France–United Kingdom relations
1960s international airliners
Quadjets
Supersonic transports
History of science and technology in the United Kingdom
Aircraft first flown in 1969